The Ujjain–Bhopal section is under the jurisdiction of Western Railway and West Central Railway. The length of Ujjain–Bhopal section is 183 km.

History

In 1895, The Ujjain–Bhopal section was opened by Bombay, Baroda and Central India Railway. Doubling of Ujjain–Maksi section and Maksi–Bhopal section (except 54 km) was completed during 1964-65 and 1993-2001 respectively. Doubling of Kalapipal-Phanda section (except 5.83 km), Akodia-Shujalpur section and Parbati-Baktal section was completed during 2003–08, 2005–10 and 2012–13 respectively.

The branch of Ujjain-Tajpur, Tajpur-Maksi and Maksi-Bolai was electrified during 1990–91. The branch of Bolai-Shujalpur, Shujalpur-Kalapipal, Kalapipal-Sehore and Sehore-Bhopal was electrified during 1991-92 respectively.

References

5 ft 6 in gauge railways in India
Rail transport in Madhya Pradesh

Transport in Ujjain
Transport in Bhopal